Mocz most commonly refers to:

People
 Mocz (surname), a family name

Elsewhere
 Meanings of minor planet names: 21001–22000#922
 Meanings of minor planet names: 24001–25000#144